Tatiana Kutlíková (born 27 September 1972) is a Slovak former cross-country skier and biathlete. She was born in Ružomberok in Czechoslovakia. She competed in cross-country skiing from 1994 to 1997. Competing at the 1994 Winter Olympics in Lillehammer, Kutlíková finished seventh in the 4 x 5 km relay and 35th in the 5 km + 10 km combined pursuit event, respectively overall and individually. She was the first woman to represent Slovakia at the Olympics.

Kutlíková's best finish at the FIS Nordic World Ski Championships was 23rd in the 30 km event at Thunder Bay, Ontario in 1995. Her best World Cup finish was 17th in a 30 km event in Slovakia in 1996.

Kutlíková's best career finish was ninth twice in an FIS race at the Czech Republic in the same weekend in 1997 (5 km, 10 km).

Ahead of the 1997–98 season, she switched to biathlon. She qualified for the Olympic team, and participated in Nagano as well as in Salt Lake City, after which she retired as an athlete.

Cross-country skiing results
All results are sourced from the International Ski Federation (FIS).

Olympic Games

World Championships

World Cup

Season standings

References

External links
 
 
 
 Women's 4 x 5 km cross-country relay Olympic results: 1976-2002 

1972 births
Living people
Slovak female biathletes
Slovak female cross-country skiers
Biathletes at the 1998 Winter Olympics
Biathletes at the 2002 Winter Olympics
Olympic biathletes of Slovakia
Cross-country skiers at the 1994 Winter Olympics
Olympic cross-country skiers of Slovakia
Sportspeople from Ružomberok